Margaret V. J. Nellist ( Woolf; born 10 December 1923), better known as Meg Woolf, and later Meg Woolf-Nellist, is a British artist, known for her watercolour paintings and for her sculptures.

Biography
Woolf was born at Thanet in Kent on 10 December 1923, and studied at the Bromley School of Art and at the Beckenham School of Art between 1939 and 1942. 

After a further period of study at the Brighton School of Art, Woolf taught art at colleges in Britain, including at the Rachel McMillan College of Education, and in Bermuda. 

She had a solo exhibition in 1948 at the Hove Museum and Art Gallery. Woolf has exhibited work at both the Royal Academy in London and with the Royal Society of British Artists, with the Artists' International Association and at commercial galleries in Britain and overseas. As well as painting with watercolours, Woolf creates sculptures in stone, wood and ivory.

References

1923 births
Living people
20th-century British sculptors
20th-century English women artists
Alumni of Ravensbourne University London
Artists from Kent
English women sculptors